is a railway station on the Hankyu Senri Line in Suita, Osaka, Japan, operated by the private railway operator Hankyu Corporation.

Lines
Kita-Senri Station is the northern terminus of the 13.6 km Hankyu Senri Line.

Station layout
The station has two side platforms serving two elevated tracks. Ticket gates are located under the platforms and the tracks.

It was the first station in the world to use automated ticket gates, developed by Omron, and introduced in 1967.

Platforms

Adjacent stations

History
Kita-Senri Station opened on 1 March 1967.

Passenger statistics
In 2011, the station was used by an average of 28,549 passengers daily.

References

External links
 Kita-Senri Station from Hankyu Railway website

Railway stations in Osaka Prefecture
Railway stations in Japan opened in 1967